Lachesilla pedicularia is a brown coloured species of Psocoptera from the Lachesillidae family that can be found in Europe.

Habitat
The species feed on beech, birch, broom, oak, pine, spruce, and yew.

References

Lachesillidae
Insects described in 1758
Psocoptera of Europe
Taxa named by Carl Linnaeus